The Isaac M. Wise Temple (formerly the Plum Street Temple) is the historic synagogue erected for Rabbi Isaac Mayer Wise and his congregation in Cincinnati, Ohio. Wise was among the founders of American Reform Judaism. The temple building was designed by prominent Cincinnati architect James Keys Wilson. Its design was inspired by the Alhambra at Granada.

The temple is located at 720 Plum Street in Cincinnati, Ohio and was built by members of the Lodge Street Synagogue. It was built chiefly during the Civil War, at a cost of $275,000. The temple was dedicated on Friday, August 24, 1866, and is among the oldest synagogue buildings still standing in the United States.

The temple is across Plum Street from the historic Saint Peter In Chains Cathedral and next to the site of the former St. Paul Episcopal Cathedral, which was torn down in 1937. In 1972, the Plum Street Temple was placed on the National Register of Historic Places, and it was designated a National Historic Landmark in 1975 for its architecture and its role in the Reform movement.

History

In 1840, a group of German Jewish immigrants in Cincinnati organized as a separate congregation, K.K. B'nai Yeshurun, breaking away from the existing congregation, K. K. Bene Israel. Their first place of worship was in a home on Third Street, between Sycamore and Broadway. In 1841 the congregation purchased and renovated for use as a house of worship a Federal-style, brick, four-story row house on Lodge Street.

The congregation built its first synagogue in 1848 on Lodge Street in the gothic Revival style.  The Lodge Street Synagogue was dedicated on September 22, 1848 in Cincinnati, Ohio. It can be seen here:

The congregation voted in 1853 to engage Rabbi Isaac Mayer Wise as its spiritual leader; this congregation built the Plum Street Temple beginning in 1865. Prior to the Civil War, the 200 families of K. K. B'nai Yeshurun (Isaac M. Wise Temple) envisioned a magnificent building to house their growing twenty-year-old congregation that had already gained a national prominence because of their rabbi, Isaac Mayer Wise. With his energy and vision, the congregation and Cincinnati were fast becoming a center of national Jewish life. Plum Street Temple was built chiefly during the Civil War, at a cost of $275,000. Plum Street Temple was dedicated on Friday, August 24, 1866. The original ledger book with all the entries of specific costs entailed in the construction of Plum Street Temple was found in the early 21st century. A commemorative march for piano, called The Progress March, by P. Martens, was published by J. L. Peters. The temple is featured prominently on the cover.

Louis Grossmann succeeded Wise and served as the Temple's rabbi from 1898 to 1922. James G. Heller was rabbi of the Temple from 1920 to 1952.

In 1972 Sally Priesand became America's first female rabbi ordained by a rabbinical seminary, and the second formally ordained female rabbi in Jewish history, after Regina Jonas of Germany in 1935. Priesand was ordained at Plum Street Temple.

In 1972, the Plum Street Temple was listed on the National Register of Historic Places.

See also
Oldest synagogues in the United States
List of National Historic Landmarks in Ohio

References

External links

Wise Temple Website
Plum Street Temple
Plum Street Temple circa 1905
Historical marker on site

German-Jewish culture in the United States
German-American culture in Cincinnati
National Register of Historic Places in Cincinnati
Synagogues in Cincinnati
Reform synagogues in Ohio
Synagogues completed in 1866
Religious organizations established in 1841
National Historic Landmarks in Ohio
Moorish Revival synagogues
Founding members of the Union for Reform Judaism
Moorish Revival architecture in Ohio
Byzantine Revival architecture in Ohio
Synagogues on the National Register of Historic Places in Ohio
1840 establishments in Ohio
Byzantine Revival synagogues
Cincinnati Local Historic Landmarks